El Ponceño, founded in 1852, was the first newspaper published in Ponce, Puerto Rico. The paper was originally named "El Observador Ponceño" but it was shortened to "El Ponceño".

History 
El Ponceño was founded by Daniel Rivera. It came to the light of day at a time of political repression of the press in Puerto Rico. Yet, "despite a late start in Puerto Rico, the press played a significant role in the literature and the cultural life of Puerto Rico. The Royal Decree of 1834 censured the printing of texts and this was also applied to the press. In 1836 there was a restoration of the freedom of the press for Spanish papers but not for papers published in the Spanish colonies. Despite this, in 1839 the Boletín Instructivo y Mercantil de Puerto Rico was established in San Juan. In 1848 El Imparcial was founded in Mayaguez; it lasted 50 days before being vanished by Governor Juan Prim. Likewise El Ponceño was also shut down, but "in its short life it managed to become part of the cultural life and the sustainment of economic development" of the area. The paper was founded in 1852 in the city of Ponce as "El Observador Ponceño" It was a weekly paper, published on Saturdays. Its offices were located on Calle Cristina, in the same structure that Luis Muñoz Rivera later published "La Democracia."

Coverage 
The paper covered issues related to municipal (improvements, roads, bridges) and island affairs as well as political matters. Poetry was one method used in the paper to publish popular thought. Satire was another. One of the better known writers in this paper was Ramon Marin. Ramon Marin later became a well-known Ponce historian and one of his grandchildren became governor of Puerto Rico.  According to Villagómez, one reason the paper evaded official censure was because it contained mostly articles that "were not a threat to the colonial political system but a criticism to the pro-slavery society in Ponce.

Closure 
Enjoying two years of continuous weekly publishing, El Ponceño was shut down by the Spanish government in July 1854. The orders came from the Spanish governor in the Island, Fernando de Norzagaray, for offending the conservative views of his administration. Tensions had been building for some time, but the 22 July 1854 publishing of a poem by Daniel Rivera title "Agüeybaná El Bravo" proved too much for the conservative Spanish government to bear. The poem praised the 1511 Taino Indian revolt against the Spanish invaders. Daniel Rivera was sent into exile by Norzagaray.

Daniel Rivera's poem read, in part, as follows:

After the closing of El Ponceño, Vilardell founded El Fénix, and performed as both reporter and editor. He also went into the insurance business.

Other Ponce-based papers 
 El Fénix (1855) 
 La Democracia (1890-1948) Imprenta El Vapor. Founded by Luis Muñoz Rivera.
 El Día (1909)
 La Perla del Sur (1982) By Juan J. Nogueras.
 La Revista de Puerto Rico 
 El Derecho (1873) By Roman Baldorioty de Castro.
 La Crónica (1894) By Ramón Marín.
 El Postillón (1890) By Francisco Gonzalo Marín.

See also 

 List of newspapers in Puerto Rico

Notes

References

External links 
 De El Ponceño de 1852 a El Imponceño de 2016. Ventanasur.  31 July 2016. Accessed 23 July 2017. Archived.
 Image of the 25 March 1854 (Year 3, Issue 91) issue of "El Ponceño". Full issue (26 pages). Accessed 18 August 2019. Archived.
 Image of the Cover page of the 2 August 1856 (Year 2, Issue 57) issue of "El Fenix". Accessed 18 August 2019. Archived.
 Image of the 8 October 1884 (Year 1, Issue 1) issue of "El Avisador Ponceño". Accessed 18 August 2019. Archived.

Defunct newspapers published in Puerto Rico
Spanish-language newspapers published in Puerto Rico
Newspapers from Ponce, Puerto Rico